The western sucker-footed bat (Myzopoda schliemanni) is a Bat endemic to Madagascar. Little is known about its habits, but they are assumed to be similar to those of the Madagascar sucker-footed bat.

It has large ears, and prominent suckers on its feet and thumbs. It has buff-brown upper parts, and mouse-gray underparts.

The species has been found on three lowland broad-leaf rainforest sites in north-western Madagascar. It is also found in dry deciduous forests. It feeds extensively on Lepidoptera, as well as cockroaches, and to a much smaller extent on Hymenoptera and beetles.

References

Myzopodidae
Bats of Africa
Endemic fauna of Madagascar
Mammals of Madagascar
Mammals described in 2006